The first 1000 days is a concept in child development that public health interventions which support children during their first 1000 days of life are especially effective.

Good nutrition at this time affects many health outcomes. There are various risk factors in the first 1000 days which, if present, are predictors of later obesity.

Children establish many of their lifetime epigenetic characteristics in their first 1000 days.

There are other health recommendations for what to do after the first 1000 days. 

Stunted growth may be remedied (catch-up growth) by attainment of proper nutritional status. This is especially important in adolescent girls, where it may break a cycle of inter-generational underdevelopment.

References

External links
First 1000 Days, a UNICEF publication

Child development
Pediatrics